This is a list of films which placed number one at the weekend box office for the year 2003.

Number-one films

References

See also
 Cinema of Austria 

Austria
2003